Green Sea may refer to:

 Green Sea, South Carolina, U.S.
Green Sea Airport
 Operation Green Sea, an amphibious attack on Guinea in 1970

See also

Sea of green (disambiguation)
Greenland Sea
Green Seamount
Codium fragile, or green sea fingers
Zoanthus sociatus, or green sea mat